Jakranpally is a Mandal in Nizamabad district in the state of Telangana in India.
Jakranpally.com is the village local portal which is developed by Pradeep Reddy of Jakranpally Development Forum.
An Airport has been Proposed in Jakranpally which carries out domestic transport.
 Ramesh Karthik Nayak, Telugu Poet and Writer belongs from this Village.

References 

Villages in Nizamabad district